This is a categorized, alphabetical list of people who are known to have been infected with the human immunodeficiency virus (HIV), the pathogen that causes AIDS, including those who have died. AIDS is a pandemic. In 2007, an estimated 33.2 million people lived with the disease worldwide, and it killed an estimated 2.1 million people, including 330,000 children. Over three-quarters of these deaths occurred in sub-Saharan Africa.

HIV is spread primarily by unprotected sex (including anal and oral sex), contaminated blood transfusions, hypodermic needles, and from mother to child during pregnancy, delivery, or breastfeeding. Because of lack of public acceptance, people infected with HIV are frequently subjected to stigma and discrimination. Publicity campaigns around the world have aimed to counter HIV-related prejudices and misconceptions and to replace them with an accurate understanding that helps to prevent new infections. These efforts have been aided by various celebrities – including American basketball star Magic Johnson and South African judge Edwin Cameron – who have publicly announced that they are HIV-positive.

Acting (film and television)

AIDS activists

Business

Criminal transmission of HIV

Film, television and radio

Music

Politics and law

Pornographic acting

Scientifically notable infections

Sports

Theatre and dance

Visual arts and fashion

Writing

Miscellaneous

References

External links
 

HIV-positive people